Durban North Commando was a light infantry regiment of the South African Army. It formed part of the South African Army Infantry Formation as well as the South African Territorial Reserve.

History

Origin

Operations

With the SADF
During the State of Emergency in the 1980s, this commando was tasked with protecting strategic facilities. The unit was primarily tasked in quelling township riots.

The unit resorted under the command of the SADF's Group 10.

First Indian officer in the Commandos
Vikram Singh of Tongaat became the first Indian officer in the commandos in 1984.

With the SANDF

Amalgamation and Disbandment
This unit was amalgamated with the Durban South Commando in 1994.

The amalgamated unit along with all other Commando units was disbanded after a decision by South African President Thabo Mbeki to disband all Commando Units. The Commando system was phased out between 2003 and 2008 "because of the role it played in the apartheid era", according to the Minister of Safety and Security Charles Nqakula.

Unit Insignia

Leadership

References

See also 
 South African Commando System

Infantry regiments of South Africa
South African Commando Units
Disbanded military units and formations in Durban